Bolivarian Military Aviation is a professional armed body designed to defend Venezuela's sovereignty and airspace. It is a service component of the National Bolivarian Armed Forces of Venezuela.

Etymology
The organization is also known as the Bolivarian National Air Force of Venezuela. Its current official name has been in use since the end of 2008. It was previously called the Venezuelan Air Force (FAV).

History

Most of the airbases in Venezuela were built in the 1960s as part of a massive expansion program. The main fighter types in those years were Venom, Vampire, and F-86. Bomber squadrons typically operated B-25 Mitchell aircraft. The 1970s and 1980s saw a considerable increase in capacity, mainly because the rising oil prices enabled the FAV to re-equip most of its units. The mixture of various aircraft types was maintained, and the Mirage IIIE and Mirage 5, VF-5A and D, T-2D, OV-10A and E, and T-27 were introduced. Venezuela was one of the first export customers for the F-16, which arrived in 1983 to equip the newly formed Grupo Aéreo de Caza 16 at El Libertador Airbase.

In the 1992 Venezuelan coup d'état attempts, elements of the Venezuelan Air Force were key participants in the rebellion. FAV units at El Libertador Air Base under the command of Brigadier General Visconti seized control of the airbase and then launched an attack on the capital.  OV-10s, T-27s, and Mirage III fighters under Visconti's command bombarded targets in the capital and loyalist air bases, destroying five CF-5 fighters on the ground. Two loyalist pilots escaped with F-16 fighters and shot down two OV-10s and a Tucano, claiming air superiority for the government. Two more rebel OV-10s were lost to ground fire.  As the tables turned on the coup attempt, General Visconti and his allies fled in two C-130s, two Mirages, an OV-10, and several SA 330 helicopters.

Modernization
The AMV purchased 24 Sukhoi Su-30 planes from Russia in July 2006, as a result of the United States embargo on spare parts for their F-16 force. In 2008, Venezuela was reported for a potential acquisition of a number of Su-35 fighter aircraft and a second batch of aircraft 12–24 Sukhoi Su-30 from Russia. It did not proceed further.

In October 2015, Venezuela announced the plan to purchase of 12 more Su-30MK2 from Russia for $480 million.

Current inventory

Ranks

Officer ranks

Professional and enlisted

References

Bibliography
 Hagedorn, Dan. "Latin Mitchells: North American B-25s in South America, Part Three". Air Enthusiast No. 107, September/October 2003. pp. 36–41.

External links

  Sitio oficial de la Aviación Militar de Venezuela
U.S. Arms Sales to Venezuela from the Dean Peter Krogh Foreign Affairs Digital Archives

Military of Venezuela
Air forces by country
Aviation in Venezuela
Military units and formations established in 1946